Esfad-e Jadid (also Romanized as Esfād-e Jadīd; also known as Esfād) is a village in Shaskuh Rural District, Central District, Zirkuh County, South Khorasan Province, Iran. At the 2006 census, its population was 628, in 172 families.

References 

Populated places in Zirkuh County